

People
 Roderick Falconer, an American poet, recording artist, and screenwriter. More commonly known as Roderick Taylor.
 Roderick Falconer (1886-1966), an English cricketer